Diamond Brittany Dixon (born June 29, 1992 in El Paso, Texas) is an American track and field athlete. She won a gold medal at the 2012 Summer Olympics in London as a member of the 4 × 400 m relay team. While she was not a member of the relay team who ran in the medal race, she took part in the race which qualified the American team for the final.  Under Olympic rules, all runners who took part in qualification races also earn medals.  While at the University of Kansas, she won the 2013 Big 12 Conference championships in the 400m, 4 × 100 m relay, and 4 × 400 m relay.  While running for Westside High School, she was the 2009 and 2010 Texas state champion in the 400 meters.

References

External links 
 
 
 
 
 
 

Living people
1992 births
American female sprinters
Athletes (track and field) at the 2012 Summer Olympics
Olympic gold medalists for the United States in track and field
Medalists at the 2012 Summer Olympics
Universiade medalists in athletics (track and field)
Universiade bronze medalists for the United States
Medalists at the 2011 Summer Universiade
Olympic female sprinters
21st-century American women